Oxford spelling (also Oxford English Dictionary spelling, Oxford style, or Oxford English spelling) is a spelling standard, named after its use by the University of Oxford, that prescribes the use of British spelling in combination with the suffix -ize in words like realize and organization, in contrast to use of -ise endings.

Oxford spelling is used by many British-based academic/science journals (for example, Nature) and many international organizations (for example, the United Nations and its agencies). It is common for academic, formal, and technical writing for an international readership (see Usage). In digital documents, Oxford spelling may be indicated by the IETF language tag en-GB-oxendict (or historically by en-GB-oed).

Defining feature 
Oxford spelling uses the suffix ize alongside yse: organization, privatize and recognizable, rather than organisation, privatise and recognisable – alongside analyse, paralyse etc. The Oxford University Press states that the belief that ize is an exclusively North American variant is incorrect.<ref
      name=         IZE
>
<p
>
</ref
> The Oxford spelling affects about 200 verbs, and is favoured on etymological grounds, in that ize corresponds more closely to the Greek root, izo, of most ize verbs.<ref
  name=   Ritter
>Ritter, R. M.
 New Hart's Rules.
   Oxford University Press, 2005,
   p. 43.
<p>    That it affects around 200 verbs, see
   Upward, Christopher and Davidson, George.
     "The suffix IZE/ISE",
  The History of English Spelling.
    John Wiley & Sons, 2011,
    p. 220.
</ref
>

The suffix ize has been in use in the UK since the 15th century,<ref
  name=IZE
/> and is the spelling variation used in North American English.

Hence, some have used the spelling ise in English, as in French, for all these words, and some prefer ise in words formed in French or English from Latin elements, retaining ize for those formed from Greek elements.

However, the suffix itself, whatever the element to which it is added, is in its origin the Greek , Latin ; and, as the pronunciation is also with z, there is no reason why in English the special French spelling should be followed, in opposition to that which is at once etymological and phonetic. In this Dictionary the termination is uniformly written ize. (In the Greek -, the i was short, so originally in Latin, but the double consonant z (= dz, ts) made the syllable long; when the z became a simple consonant, /idz/ became īz, whence English /aɪz/.)

The Oxford use of ize does not extend to the spelling of words not traced to the Greek izo suffix. One group of such words is those ending in lyse, such as analyse, paralyse and catalyse, which come from the Greek verb , lyo, the perfective (aorist) stem of which is lys-: for these lyse is the more etymological spelling. Others include advertise, arise, compromise, chastise, disguise, improvise, prise (in the sense of open), and televise.

In addition to the OUP's "Oxford"-branded dictionaries, other British dictionary publishers that list ize suffixes first include Cassell, Collins and Longman.

Usage 
Oxford spelling is used by the Oxford University Press (OUP) for British publications, including its Oxford English Dictionary (OED) and its influential British style guide Hart's Rules, and by other publishers who are "etymology conscious", according to Merriam-Webster.

Oxford spelling (especially the first form listed in the Concise Oxford English Dictionary, Twelfth Edition) is the official or de facto spelling standard used in style guides of the international organizations that belong to the United Nations System. This includes the World Health Organization, the International Telecommunication Union, the International Labour Organization, the World Food Programme, the International Court of Justice, and UNESCO, and all UN treaties and declarations, such as the Universal Declaration of Human Rights.

Other international organizations that adhere to this standard include the International Organization for Standardization (ISO), the International Electrotechnical Commission (IEC), the World Trade Organization (WTO), the North Atlantic Treaty Organization (NATO), the International Atomic Energy Agency (IAEA), Interpol, the International Committee of the Red Cross (ICRC), the World Wide Fund for Nature (WWF), Amnesty International (AI), the World Economic Forum (WEF) and the Global Biodiversity Information Facility (GBIF).

Oxford spelling is used in a number of academic publications, including the London-based scientific journal Nature and all other UK-based "Nature"-branded journals, the Philosophical Transactions of the Royal Society, and the Journal of Physiology. It is used by The Times Literary Supplement, Encyclopædia Britannica and Cambridge University Press. Newspapers and magazines in the UK normally use -ise. The style guide of The Times recommended -ize until 1992, when it switched to -ise. The newspaper's chief revise editor, Richard Dixon, wrote of the change:

In both the King James Bible and the works of Shakespeare, -ize endings are used throughout. Well-known literary works that use Oxford spelling include The Lord of the Rings by J. R. R. Tolkien (an Oxford University professor), And Then There Were None by Agatha Christie (married to an All Souls archaeologist), and The Lion, the Witch and the Wardrobe by C. S. Lewis (a fellow of Magdalen College, Oxford). The original white paper for Bitcoin also uses Oxford spelling.

Oxford spelling is not necessarily followed by the staff of the University of Oxford. The university's style guide, last updated in 2016, recommended the use of -ise for internal use.

Language tag comparison 
The following table summarizes a few general spelling differences between five major english spelling conventions, and a french one for reference. Note: en-GB simply stands for British English; it is not specified whether -ize or -ise should be used. The language tag en-GB-oxendict, however, demands the use of -ize and -ization.

See also 

 Canadian English spelling
 Macquarie Dictionary (Australian usage)
 Oxford comma
 Spelling differences: -ise, -ize

References

Bibliography 
 The Oxford English Dictionary (1st ed.)
  The Oxford English Dictionary 2nd ed. (20 vols.)
The Oxford English Dictionary, Oxford: Oxford University Press (latest edition: on WWW)

Further reading 
IANA Language Tag Registration Form for en-GB-oed
AskOxford: Are spellings like privatize and organize Americanisms?
 British Medical Journal: -ize right
World Wide Words: The endings "-ise" and "-ize"
Detailed blog post about -ise and -ize verbs in British English.
Tieken-Boon Van Ostade, Ingrid. An Introduction to Late Modern English. Edinburgh University Press, 2009, p. 38.

15th-century introductions
American and British English differences
Spelling
English orthography
Spelling